The Soviet Union's 1975 nuclear test series was a group of 19 nuclear tests conducted in 1975. These tests  followed the 1974 Soviet nuclear tests series and preceded the 1976 Soviet nuclear tests series.

References

1975
1975 in the Soviet Union
1975 in military history
Explosions in 1975